Holmegaard Glass Factory is a glass factory located in the former municipality of Holmegaard just outside Næstved.

History 
The home of Holmegaard Glassworks is located in the town of Fensmark, Holmegaard. The company was founded in 1823 after Count Christian Danneskjold-Samsøe petitioned the Danish king for permission to build a glassworks at Holmegaard Mose ("Holmegaard Bog"). He died before permission was granted. But after his death when permission was finally received his widow, Countess Henriette Danneskiold-Samsøe pursued the project and began production in 1825 of green bottles, moving on to table-glass within its first decade.

Much of its early work was derivative and inconsequential, but between the 1930s and 1980s its fortunes were transformed by the designs of Jacob E. Bang (1899-1965), Per Lütken (1916-98), and Bang's son, Michael (1944-2002).

Today the company is known for its high-quality products of Danish design.

The Lütken Era 
Danish glassmaker Per Lütken worked at Holmegaard from 1942 until his death in 1998, creating some of the factory's finest pieces and all-time classics, such as the "Idelle" series, the "Ships glasses" and the "Provence" bowls.

The work of Per Lütken is still highly rated, especially throughout Scandinavia, and in Denmark and Sweden in particular.

The arrival of Lütken at Holmegaard marked a new beginning in the history of the factory, which once again bloomed after several years of suffering. His aesthetic creations, in timeless designs, appealed to the fashion of the 1960s Denmark, and his creations became a great success throughout the decade and the 1970s.

The split 
In 1995 was the packaging part sold to Ardagh which is now called Ardagh Glass Holmegaard, the art part was then sold in 2004 to the development company Ibco, which wanted to turn the place into an experience center Holmegaard Entertainment.

Later 
On September 9, 2008 it went bankrupt, when the Holmegaard brand was taken over by Rosendahl A / S. The old glassworks building in Holmegaard was put up for auction in March 2010 and was now taken over by danish Sparekassen Faaborg.

Now 
In 2020, the place reopened under the name Holmegaard Værk. It is a museum, with a very large number (40,000) Holmegaard products in the collection are exhibited, some of the most famous can be seen up close. In addition, changing glass artists demonstrate how to work with glass and you can even try sanding glass.

Famous glassmakers at Holmegaard 
- Jacob E. Bang- Per Lütken

External links 
  
 Holmegaard Glass Company
 Jacob E. Bang and Holmegaards Glasværk 1926-1952
 Per Lütken's 1969 'Carnaby' Series Identification Guide
 Article in Danish "Dagbladet" about Holmegaard Glass Factory 
 Danish Wikipedia page

References 
 Municipal statistics: NetBorger Kommunefakta, delivered from KMD aka Kommunedata (Municipal Data)
 Municipal mergers and neighbors: Eniro new municipalities map

Glassmaking companies of Denmark
Purveyors to the Court of Denmark
Danish companies established in 1825
Danish brands
Companies based in Næstved Municipality